Saint-Quentin is a civil parish in Restigouche County, New Brunswick, Canada.

For governance purposes it is divided between the town of Saint-Quentin, the incorporated rural community of Kedgwick, and the Northwest rural district, both members of the Northwest Rural Service Commission.

Before the 2023 governance reform, the parish was divided between a much smaller town of Saint-Quentin and local service districts of St. Martin de Restigouche and the parish of Saint-Quentin. In the reform, St. Martin de Restigouche was annexed by Saint-Quentin while the parish LSD was divided by the town, rural community, and rural district.

Origin of name
The parish was named for the Battle of St. Quentin, an Allied victory during the First World War.

History
Saint-Quentin was erected in 1921 from Grimmer Parish.

Boundaries
Saint-Quentin Parish is bounded:

 on the north by the Quebec provincial border;
 on the east by a line beginning on the Patapedia River at a point due north of where the southern boundary of Grimmer Parish strikes the Restigouche River slightly upstream of the mouth of Seven Mile Brook, then running due south to Restigouche River, then running easterly along the prolongation of the southern line of a grant to Paul Berube on the eastern side of Route 17, about 3 kilometres north of Chemin 36 No. 1, the Berube grant, and the prolongation easterly to a point about 4.9 kilometres east of Range 9 & 10 Road, then south-southeasterly along a line running from the mouth of Upper Thorn Point Brook on the Restigouche through the former Intercolonial Railway station in Whites Brook and to the Victoria County line;
 on the southwest by the Victoria and Madawaska County lines;
 on the west by Quebec.

Communities
Communities at least partly within the parish. bold indicates an incorporated municipality

 Five Fingers
 Hazen
 Rang-Cinq-et-Six
 Rang-Dix
 Rang-Dix-Huit
 Rang-Douze-Nord
 Rang-Douze-Sud
 Rang-Quatorze
 Rang-Seize
 Rang-Sept-et-Huit
 Rapids Depot
 Saint-Quentin
 Saint-Martin-de-Restigouche
 Limerick

Bodies of water
Bodies of water at least partly within the parish.

 Little Main Restigouche River
 McDougall Lake Branch
 Northwest Upsalquitch River
 Patapedia River
 Pemouet Branch
 States Lake Branch
 Wild Goose Branch
 Gin Creek
 Clearwater Lake
 County Line Lake
 Eightmile Lake
 Gounamitz Lake
 Miller Lake
 Mud Lake
 States Lake
 Tardif Lake
 Trout Lake
 Wild Goose Lake
 Gounamitz River
 North Branch Gounamitz River
 West Branch Gounamitz River
 Green River (French Rivière Verte)
 Little Forks Branch Green River
 Right Hand Branch Green River
 Kedgwick River
 Belle Kedgwick River
 Fire Trail Branch
 North Branch Kedgwick River
 South Branch Kedgwick River

Other notable places
Parks, historic sites, and other noteworthy places at least partly within the parish.

 Bells Brook Protected Natural Area
 Belone Brook Protected Natural Area
 Big Cedar Brook Protected Natural Area
 Connors Brook Protected Natural Area
 Dionne Brook Protected Natural Area
 Eight Mile Brook Protected Natural Area
 Five Mile Brook Protected Natural Area
 Jardine Brook Protected Natural Area
 Kedgwick Wildlife Management Area
 Little Cedar Brook Protected Natural Area
 MacFarlane Brook Protected Natural Area
 Moose Valley Hill Protected Natural Area
 Patapedia River Protected Natural Area
 Pollard Brook Protected Natural Area
 Quigley Brook Protected Natural Area
 South Kedgwick River Protected Natural Area

Demographics
Parish population total does not include the town of Saint-Quentin

Population

Language

Access Routes
Highways and numbered routes that run through the parish, including external routes that start or finish at the parish limits:

Highways

Principal Routes

Secondary Routes:

External Routes:
None

See also
List of parishes in New Brunswick
Rimouski River

Notes

References

Local service districts of Restigouche County, New Brunswick
Parishes of Restigouche County, New Brunswick